National holidays in Belarus are classified into state holidays and other holidays and commemorative days, including religious holidays. Nine of them are non-working days.

Public holidays (non-working days)

Other holidays

State

Commemorative and remembrance days

Traditional holidays 
Also, there are a number of traditional holidays.

References

 
Belarus
Belarusian culture
Society of Belarus
Holidays